Niklas Jensen Wassberg (born 12 June 2004) is a Norwegian football midfielder who plays for Brann.

He played youth football for FK Fyllingsdalen before joining SK Brann ahead of the 2020 season. While the original intention was for him to start his senior career on loan at Fyllingsdalen, he was instead given a senior contract in Brann, and made his Eliteserien debut in May 2021 against Molde.

Niklas Jensen Wassberg is a son of Roy Wassberg and maternal grandson of Roald Jensen.

References

2004 births
Living people
Footballers from Bergen
Norwegian footballers
SK Brann players
Eliteserien players
Association football midfielders